Robert Moore (born March 31, 2002) is an American professional baseball second baseman in the Milwaukee Brewers organization.

Amateur career
Moore attended Shawnee Mission East High School in Prairie Village, Kansas. He played for USA Baseball twice as an amateur. As a sophomore at Shawnee Mission East, he batted .392. In July 2019, he participated in the Under Armour All-America Baseball Game at Wrigley Field. He graduated from high school early in December 2019 so he could enroll at the University of Arkansas to play college baseball.

As a freshman at Arkansas in 2020, Moore started all 16 of Arkansas' games in which he batted .317 with two home runs and 17 RBIs before the season was cancelled due to the COVID-19 pandemic. That summer, he played in the Northwoods League for the Rochester Honkers. He earned postseason All-Star honors after batting .303 with twenty stolen bases and 22 walks over 119 at-bats. In 2021, Moore returned as the starting second baseman for the Razorbacks. On March 30, he became the first Razorback since 1994 to hit for the cycle in a 21-8 win over Central Arkansas University. Over 61 games for the season, he slashed .283/.408/.558 with 16 home runs and 53 RBIs. His 16 home runs were most on the team. He was named to the USA Baseball National Collegiate Team that summer. Moore entered the 2022 season as a top prospect for the upcoming draft. His draft stock fell after he ended the season batting .233 with eight home runs and 44 RBIs over 63 games. He was awarded an ABCA/Rawlings Gold Glove.

Professional career
The Milwaukee Brewers selected Moore with the 72nd overall pick of the 2022 Major League Baseball draft. He signed with the team for $800,000.

Moore made his professional debut with the Arizona Complex League Brewers and was promoted to the Carolina Mudcats after four games. Over 31 games, he batted .248 with three home runs, 16 RBIs, and seven stolen bases.

Personal life
Moore is a Christian. Moore's father, Dayton Moore, was the president of the Kansas City Royals.

References

External links
Arkansas Razorbacks bio

2002 births
Living people
People from Leawood, Kansas
Baseball players from Kansas
Baseball second basemen
Arkansas Razorbacks baseball players
United States national baseball team players
Arizona Complex League Brewers players